"Tom Sawyer" is a song by Canadian rock band Rush, originally released on their 1981 album Moving Pictures as its opener. The band's lead singer, bassist, and keyboardist, Geddy Lee, has referred to the track as the band's "defining piece ... from the early '80s". It is one of Rush's best-known songs and a staple of both classic rock radio and Rush's live performances, having been played on every concert tour since its release.

Background and recording 
The song was written by Geddy Lee, drummer Neil Peart, and guitarist Alex Lifeson in collaboration with lyricist Pye Dubois of the band Max Webster, who also co-wrote the Rush songs "Force Ten", "Between Sun and Moon", and "Test for Echo". According to the US radio show In the Studio with Redbeard (which devoted an episode to the making of Moving Pictures), "Tom Sawyer" came about during a summer rehearsal vacation that Rush spent at Ronnie Hawkins' farm outside Toronto. Peart was presented with a poem by Dubois named "Louis the Lawyer" (often incorrectly cited as "Louis the Warrior") that he modified and expanded. Lee and Lifeson then helped set the poem to music. The "growling" synthesizer sound heard in the song came from Lee experimenting with his Oberheim OB-X. For "Tom Sawyer", Lee switched from his Rickenbacker 4001 to a Fender Jazz Bass he purchased from a pawn shop.

In the December 1985 Rush Backstage Club newsletter, drummer and lyricist Neil Peart said:

Alex Lifeson describes his guitar solo in "Tom Sawyer" in a 2007 interview:

Record World described the song as a "Zeppelinesque power ballad" which "breaks into a dynamic, demonic jam."

Personnel
Geddy Lee – vocals, bass guitar, keyboards
Alex Lifeson – guitar
Neil Peart – drums

Single release 
The song peaked at number 24 in Canada, number 44 on the US Billboard Hot 100, and number eight on the Billboard Top Tracks chart. The studio version of "Tom Sawyer", despite its popularity, did not see a single-release in other territories. In the UK, "Vital Signs" was chosen as the single from Moving Pictures. "Tom Sawyer" is one of the most played songs on classic rock radio in the United States, is the most played Canadian song from before 1988 by Canadian rock radio stations during the Neilson BDS Era (which started in 1995), and is the fifth most downloaded Canadian digital song from the 1980s. In 2009, it placed 19th on VH1's list of 100 Greatest Songs of Hard Rock. "Tom Sawyer" was one of five Rush songs inducted into the Canadian Songwriters Hall of Fame on March 28, 2010.

The live version of "Tom Sawyer" from Exit...Stage Left peaked at number 25 on the UK Singles Chart in October 1981.

Charts

Weekly charts

See also
List of songs recorded by Rush
The Adventures of Tom Sawyer, the book that is referenced in the song

References

External links
 "Tom Sawyer" at Rush's Official website
 

1981 singles
Rush (band) songs
Music videos directed by Bruce Gowers
Songs written by Alex Lifeson
Songs written by Geddy Lee
Songs written by Neil Peart
Song recordings produced by Terry Brown (record producer)
1981 songs
Mercury Records singles
Songs with lyrics by Pye Dubois